Mosi-oa-Tunya or Mosi oa Tunya usually refers to Victoria Falls, a waterfall on the Zambia–Zimbabwe border. It may also refer to:

 Victoria Falls, Zimbabwe, a resort town
 Mosi-oa-Tunya (coin), a gold coin currency of Zimbabwe
 Mosi-oa-Tunya National Park, a national park in Zambia